Richard Daniels (1864–1939) was a Welsh-born American film actor.

Richard Daniels may also refer to:

Mickey Daniels (Richard Daniels Jr., 1914–1970), American actor
Dick Daniels (Richard Bernard Daniels, born 1944), American football defensive back
Richard Daniels, a character in The Son of Dr. Jekyll

See also
Rik Daniëls (born 1962), Belgian television director
Richard Daniel (1900–1986), German soldier
Richard Daniel (priest) (1681–1739), Church of Ireland priest